Tsentral'ny Stadium is a multi-purpose stadium in Pyatigorsk, Russia. It was built in 1966 and was formerly called Trud Stadium until 2001. It is currently used mostly for football matches and is the home stadium of FC Mashuk-KMV Pyatigorsk. From 2004 until 2007 it was the home stadium of FC Terek Grozny.  The stadium can hold up to 10,365 people.

Football venues in Russia
Sport in Stavropol Krai
Multi-purpose stadiums in Russia
Buildings and structures in Stavropol Krai
Pyatigorsk